John T. "J.T." Curtis Jr. (born 1947) is a high school football coach for John Curtis Christian School. He is most known for his 618 wins, which is the most wins in Louisiana history and the second most wins all-time in US history as a coach. In 2010, he was inducted to the Louisiana Sports Hall of Fame and in 2015, he was inducted to the National High School Hall of Fame. As of the conclusion of the 2022 season, his coaching record stands stands as 618 wins, 76 losses, and 6 ties in 54 seasons.

Early life

Curtis is a native of New Orleans, Louisiana. Curtis graduated from East Jefferson High School in Metairie, Louisiana in 1966, where he was an all-state and All-American offensive lineman for the school's football team. Curtis attended the University of Arkansas on a football scholarship for three years before transferring to Louisiana Christian University in 1968, where he continued to play football.

Coaching career
Curtis' father, John T. Curtis, Sr., founded John Curtis Christian School in River Ridge, Louisiana in 1962 where he was named head football coach there in 1969 at the age of 22. In his first season, the Patriots football team finished the year 0-10 and scored only two touchdowns the entire season. The following season the Patriots made the playoffs and by 1973 they had their first appearance in the LHSAA quarterfinals. In 1975, Curtis led his team to the school's first football state championship, defeating Notre Dame High School of Crowley, Louisiana by a score of 13-12. 

The team have won 27 state championships to date, the most for any high school football program in Louisiana history, far surpassing the team with the second-most championships, Haynesville High School in Haynesville, Louisiana, who holds 17 state championships.

As of the 2022 season, J.T. Curtis Jr. is currently the winningest high school football coach in Louisiana history, the winningest active high school football coach nationally, and the second-winningest high school football coach all-time nationally behind only John McKissick, who won 620 games in 63 seasons at Summerville High School in Summerville, South Carolina. He achieved his 600th win, only the second coach in the nation to ever do so, with a 37-16 win over Archbishop Shaw High School in 2021.

In 2012, the John Curtis football program was named the national champion by five national polls after going an undefeated 14-0 and defeating Evangel Christian Academy of Shreveport, Louisiana 35-13 in the LHSAA Class 2A state championship game. It was the first ever national title for Curtis and the Patriots football program and the first by a team from Louisiana since West Monroe High School was named national champions in 2000, and they are also the only team from Louisiana to receive the honor since. In 2013, the Patriots football program was forced to forfeit 20 wins from 2013 to 2015, including their 2013 state championship, due to sanctions by the LHSAA around the eligibility of now former JCCS football player Willie Allen. Curtis and the school have maintained to date that there were no improprieties regarding Allen.

In his storied career, Curtis has coached 14 players who played in the NFL including Joe McKnight, Malachi Dupre, Duke Riley, Kenny Young, and Danny Wimprine among others. He has also coached dozens of high school All-Americans and players who went on to compete on the college level. He also had at least one player named first team all-state every year from 1975 to 2019, a state record. The Patriots won five consecutive state championships, the only team in Louisiana to ever do so, from 2004 to 2008. They have also won four consecutive titles once (1996-99) and three consecutive titles twice (1979-81, 1983-85).

He has also won three state championships as head baseball coach at John Curtis.

Awards, recognition, records
 Most Consecutive State Championships (5)
 Most Consecutive State Title Game Appearances (14)
 Most Consecutive Games Without Being Shut Out (303) (National Record)
 27x LHSAA Football State Champion 
 3x LHSAA Baseball State Champion
 9x LFCA Coach of the Year
 6x LSWA Coach of the Year
 1964 Parade High School Football All-American
 1992 inductee to the Louisiana High School Sports Hall of Fame
 1994 inductee to the Louisiana Christian University Athletic Hall of Fame
 2010 inductee to the Louisiana Sports Hall of Fame
 2015 inductee to the National High School Hall of Fame
 Named 1980s Coach of the Decade by the National Sports Foundation

State championships
1975 LHSAA Class 2A (defeated Notre Dame), 13-12)
1977 LHSAA Class 2A (defeated Jonesboro-Hodge, 45-0)
1979 LHSAA Class 2A (defeated Patterson, 28-0)
1980 LHSAA Class 2A (defeated Jonesboro-Hodge, 21-3)
1981 LHSAA Class 2A (defeated E.D. White Catholic, 21-17
1983 LHSAA Class 2A (defeated Belle Chasse, 38-0)
1984 LHSAA Class 2A (defeated Ferriday, 23-7)
1985 LHSAA Class 3A (defeated Wossman, 28-0)
1987 LHSAA Class 3A (defeated Amite, 27-14)
1988 LHSAA Class 3A (defeated Washington-Marion, 14-7)
1990 LHSAA Class 3A (defeated Washington-Marion, 42-13)
1993 LHSAA Class 4A (defeated Wossman, 42-14)
1996 LHSAA Class 4A (defeated Crowley, 28-7)
1997 LHSAA Class 4A (defeated Eunice, 21-6)
1998 LHSAA Class 4A (defeated Eunice, 20-7)
1999 LHSAA Class 4A (defeated Capitol, 16-0)
2001 LHSAA Class 4A (defeated Baker, 30-0)
2002 LHSAA Class 4A (defeated O.P. Walker, 16-14)
2004 LHSAA Class 4A (defeated Northside, 29-14)
2005 LHSAA Class 2A (defeated St. Charles Catholic, 31-6
2006 LHSAA Class 2A (defeated St. Charles Catholic, 41-7
2007 LHSAA Class 2A (defeated St. James, 28-13)
2008 LHSAA Class 2A (defeated Evangel Christian, 35-14)
2011 LHSAA Class 2A (defeated Winnfield, 33-3)
2012 LHSAA Class 2A (defeated Evangel Christian, 35-13
2013 LHSAA Division II (defeated University Lab, 32-0) (Later forfeited)
2018 LHSAA Division I (defeated Catholic-Baton Rouge, 49-7)
2022 LHSAA Division I Select (defeated Brother Martin, 23-0)

References

External links
 John Curtis Christian School website

Living people
Arkansas Razorbacks football players
East Jefferson High School alumni
High school football coaches in Louisiana
Louisiana Christian University alumni
Louisiana Christian Wildcats football players
People from River Ridge, Louisiana
Players of American football from New Orleans
1947 births